The 2016 United States House of Representatives elections in Minnesota were held on November 8, 2016, to elect the eight U.S. representatives from the state of Minnesota, one from each of the state's eight congressional districts. The elections coincided with the 2016 U.S. presidential election, as well as other elections to the House of Representatives, elections to the United States Senate and various state and local elections. The primaries were held on August 9. This is the last cycle Democrats won either the 1st or 8th district.

Overview

District 1

Democrat Tim Walz of the Minnesota Democratic–Farmer–Labor Party defeated Republican Jim Hagedorn to retain his seat.

Republican primary

Candidates
 Jim Hagedorn, blogger, candidate in 2010 and nominee in 2014
 Steve Williams

Results

Democratic primary

Candidates
 Tim Walz, incumbent U.S. Representative

Results

General election

Results

District 2

Republican John Kline had represented Minnesota's second district since 2003, but announced that he would not seek re-election in 2016.

Jason Lewis won the district's Republican primary, defeating opponents Matthew Erickson, John Howe, and Darlene Miller. Democrat Angela Craig, who served as vice president of global human resources for St. Jude Medical, resigned from her position in January 2015 to challenge Lewis. Mary Lawrence, a doctor, also ran as a Democrat but dropped out before the primary.

Commentators wrote that the election was "likely to be one of the most-watched congressional races in the country," (MinnPost), "expected to be one of the most competitive in the country", according to Roll Call newspaper, and "seen as a prime target for Democrats to flip" according to The Atlantic.

Area left-wing weekly City Pages described the campaign as resembling the 2016 presidential campaign, calling Lewis  "an entrepreneur and media personality, whose blunt rhetoric is refreshingly honest to some, simply offensive to others",  and describing Craig as "a tough female leader with moderate positions, ties to big business, and a penchant for pantsuits".

In May 2016, the Rothenberg and Gonzales Political Report changed its rating of the race from "pure tossup" to "tossup/tilt Democratic," with political analyst Nathan Gonzales writing that Craig "is probably to the left of the district in her ideology, but she has a good story to tell, is raising considerable money (she had $1.3 million in the bank at the end of March) and is solid as a candidate." Other political prognosticators rated the race "Republican Toss-up" (Charlie Cook), and "pure" toss-up (Larry Sabato's "Crystal Ball"), according to MinnPost.

Lewis ended up defeating Craig by several thousand votes in the November.

Republican primary

Candidates
Declared
 John Howe, former state senator, former mayor of Red Wing and candidate for Minnesota Secretary of State in 2014
 Jason Lewis, political commentator, former talk radio host, and nominee for CO-02 in 1990
 Darlene Miller, president and CEO of Permac Industries and member of the President's Council on Jobs and Competitiveness
 Matthew Erickson, Minnesota spokesperson for Donald Trump

Withdrawn
 David Benson-Staebler, political consultant, former Democratic congressional aide, and real estate agent
 David Gerson, engineer and candidate in 2012 and 2014
 Pam Myhra, former state representative and candidate for lieutenant governor in 2014

Declined
 Tony Albright, state representative
 Ted Daley, former state senator
 Steve Drazkowski, state representative
 Pat Garofalo, state representative
 John Kline, incumbent U.S. Representative
 John Kriesel, former state representative
 Mike McFadden, businessman and nominee for U.S. Senate in 2014
 Mary Pawlenty, former Dakota County District Court Judge and former First Lady of Minnesota
 Roz Peterson, state representative
 Eric Pratt, state senator
 Steve Sviggum, former Speaker of the Minnesota House of Representatives
 Dave Thompson, state senator and candidate for governor in 2014

Endorsements

Results

Democratic primary

Candidates
Declared
 Angie Craig, former St. Jude Medical executive

Withdrawn
 Roger Kittelson, dairy marketing specialist, nominee for WI-06 in 2008 and candidate for Minnesota House of Representatives in 1982 and 2014
 Mary Lawrence, ophthalmologist

Declined
 Joe Atkins, state representative
 Rick Hansen, state representative
 Mike Obermueller, former state representative and nominee in 2012 and 2014

Endorsements

Results

General election

Polling

Results

District 3

Republican Erik Paulsen retained his seat, comfortably defeating DFL State Senator Terri Bonoff.

General election

Polling

Results

District 4

Democrat Betty McCollum retained her seat over Republican challenger Greg Ryan.

Republican primary

Candidates
 Greg Ryan
 Gene Rechtzigel
 Nikolay Nikolayevich Bey

Results

Democratic primary

Candidates
 Betty McCollum, incumbent U.S. Representative
 Steve Carlson

Results

General election

Results

District 5

Democrat Keith Ellison retained his seat, comfortably defeating Republican Frank Nelson Drake and a third-party challenger.

Democratic primary
 Keith Ellison, incumbent U.S. Representative
 Gregg Iverson, perennial candidate
 Lee Bauer

Results

Republican primary
 Frank Nelson Drake

Results

General election

Results

District 6

First term incumbent Republican Tom Emmer defeated DFL candidate David Snyder.

Republican primary

Candidates
 Tom Emmer, incumbent U.S. Representative
 A.J. Kern
 Patrick Munro

Results

Democratic primary

Candidates
 David Snyder
 Judy Evelyn Adams
 Bob Helland

Results

General election

Results

District 7

Democrat Collin Peterson retained his seat, defeating Republican challenger Dave Hughes.

Republican primary
 Dave Hughes
 Amanda Lynn Hinson

Results

Democratic primary
 Collin Peterson, incumbent U.S. Representative

Results

General election

Results

District 8

Democrat Rick Nolan retained his seat, defeating Republican Stewart Mills III in the 2016 election. It was Nolan's second victory over Mills, who unsuccessfully challenged Nolan in the 2014 election.

Though Nolan's margin of victory in 2016 (2,009 votes) was too large to trigger a publicly funded automatic recount, Mills, as of late November 2016, has said that he plans to request and pay for a hand recount of all votes cast in the eighth district, as is his right under law. Mills plans to cover the cost of the recount—just over $100,000— himself. According to the Minneapolis Star Tribune, Minnesota has not seen a recount in a race for the House of Representatives since the year 2000, when election day totals in Minnesota's 2nd congressional district fell within the half percentage point threshold, thus triggering a state-funded recount. It is not known if Mills's request for a privately funded recount has precedent in Minnesota's electoral history, at least as it pertains to elections for the House of Representatives.

General election

Endorsements

Polling

Results

References

External links
U.S. House elections in Minnesota, 2016 at Ballotpedia
Campaign contributions at OpenSecrets

Minnesota
2016
2016 Minnesota elections